Wiñaq (Quechua for "growing", "the one that grows" or a kind of tree (Tabebuia nodosa), also spelled Huiñac) is a mountain in the Cordillera Central in the Andes of Peru which reaches a height of approximately . It is located in the Lima Region, Yauyos Province, Tanta District. Wiñaq lies west of a lake named Pawqarqucha and south of P'itiqucha.

References 

Mountains of Peru
Mountains of Lima Region